Candar or Çandar may refer to:

 Isfendiyarids, also known as Jandarids or Candaroğulları, a medieval Anatolian Turkish beylik
 Candar corps, palace guards in some medieval Turkish states
 Cendere, Nallıhan, historically known as Çandar, a village in Nallıhan district, Ankara Province, Turkey
 Çandarlı family, a prominent Turkish political family in the Ottoman Empire, from the village
 Çandarlı, a town and district of İzmir Province, Turkey, named after the family